The Winding Stair is a 1925 American silent drama film directed by John Griffith Wray and starring Alma Rubens, Edmund Lowe, and Warner Oland. It is based on the 1923 novel of the same name by the British writer A.E.W. Mason.

Plot
As described in a film magazine review, a French Legionnaire on foreign station loves a cafe dancer, and when the natives rebel and the young woman is endangered, the officer leaves his command to go to the woman’s aid. His friend saves him from court-martial and he heads a regiment in the World War. When the war ends, he marries the dancer.

Cast

Preservation
With no prints of The Winding Stair located in any film archives, it is lost film.

References

Bibliography
 Goble, Alan (1999). The Complete Index to Literary Sources in Film. Walter de Gruyter.

External links

 

1925 films
1925 drama films
1920s English-language films
American silent feature films
Silent American drama films
Films directed by John Griffith Wray
Fox Film films
Films set in deserts
American black-and-white films
Lost American films
1920s American films